Caleb Montgomery (born 19 June 1995) is an Irish rugby union player, currently playing for English Premiership and European Rugby Champions Cup side Worcester Warriors. He plays as a number 8 or flanker. Montgomery made his Premiership debut v Wasps coming off the bench.

Early life
Born in Portadown, Montgomery plays his club rugby for Banbridge in the All-Ireland League.

Professional career

Ulster
Montgomery made his senior Ulster debut on 5 January 2019 in round 13 of the 2018–19 Pro14, featuring off the bench in the provinces 40–7 loss against rivals Leinster.

Worcester Warriors
Montgomery joined English Premiership club Worcester Warriors ahead of the 2019–20 season.

References

External links
Ulster Profile
Pro14 Profile

1995 births
Living people
Ampthill RUFC players
Cornish Pirates players
Expatriate rugby union players in England
Irish expatriate sportspeople in England
Irish rugby union players
Rugby union flankers
Rugby union number eights
Rugby union players from Portadown
Ulster Rugby players
Worcester Warriors players